Ghulam Mohammad, also spelled Ghulam Mohammed, Ghulam Muhammad, Ghulam Muhammed, Gholam Mohammad, Gulam Mohammad etc., is a male Muslim given name. It may refer to:

Nawab Sayyid Ghulam Muhammad Ali Khan I Bahadur (died 1825), twice Nawab of Banganapalle in India
Ghulam Muhammad Khan (1763–1828), briefly Nawab of Rampur
Ghulam Muhammad Sultan Sahib (1795–1872), son and heir of Tipu Sultan, the Indian warrior-emperor of Mysore
Ghulam Muhammad Ghouse Khan (1824–1855), twelfth and last Nawab of the Carnatic
Ghulam Muhammad Tarzi (1830–1900), Governor of Baluchistan
Ghulam Muhammad Ali Khan (1882–1952), fifth Prince of Arcot
Malik Ghulam Muhammad (1895–1956), Governor-General of Pakistan
Ghulam Muhammad Ghobar (1897–1978), Afghan historian, journalist, political figure, and poet
Ghulam Mohammad Farhad (1901–1984), Afghan engineer and Pashtun nationalist
Ghulam Mohammad Khan (born 1923), Indian Parliamentarian from Moradabad
Ghulam Mohammed (composer) (1903–1968), Indian film score composer
Bakshi Ghulam Mohammad (1907–1972), Prime Minister of Jammu and Kashmir
Ghulam Mohammed Sadiq (1912–1971), Prime Minister of Jammu and Kashmir
Ghulam Mohammad Shah (1920–2009), Indian politician, Chief Minister of Jammu and Kashmir
Ghulam Mohammad A. Fecto (1922–2007), founder and chairman of Fecto Group 
Gulam Mohammed Sheikh (born 1937), Indian painter, writer and art critic
Ghulam Mohammad Saznawaz (?–2014), master of Kashmiri Sufiyana music
Ghulam Muhammad Qasir (1944–1999), Pakistani poet
Ghulam Mohammed (politician) (born 1953), Indian politician
Ghulam Mohammed Baloch (1959–2009), Baloch nationalist politician
Gholam Mohammad Nousher, known as Gholam Nousher (born 1964), Bangladeshi cricketer
Ghulam Mohammed Abdul Khader (died 1993), seventh prince of the House of Arcot
Ghulam Muhammad Khan Mahar (died 1995), Pakistani politician
Ghulam Muhammad Malik (Lieutenant General), commander of the X Corps, Rawalpindi of the Pakistan Army
Ghulam Mohammad (cricketer, born 1976), Pakistani cricketer
Ghulam Mohammad (cricketer, born 1898) (1898–1966)
Ghulam Muhammad (Gilgit-Baltistan politician) (active from 2020)

See also
 Kot Ghulam Muhammad
 Ghulam Muhammad Abad
 Ghulam (disambiguation)
 Mohammad